Easterwood may refer to:

Easterwood (surname), a surname
Easterwood Airport, an airport in Brazos County, Texas, United States
11691 Easterwood, a main-belt asteroid